Alexandria is a 2005 Indonesian film, featuring a soundtrack album by Indonesian pop rock band Noah dan considered as the bestselling soundtrack album in Indonesia with sold 1,3 million copies.

Plot 
Bagas (Marcel Chandrawinata) has a crush on his neighbor and childhood friend, Alexandria (Julie Estelle), but he is unable to express it. Things change when Bagas realizes that his best friend, Rafi (Fachri Albar), is also pursuing Alexandria, and that she may like him as well.

References

External links 
 
 Alexandria at Layar Film

2005 films
Indonesian drama films
2000s Indonesian-language films
Films shot in Indonesia